Tathodelta purpurascens is a moth of the family Noctuidae first described by George Hampson in 1893. It is found in India, Sri Lanka, Borneo and Bali.

Its forewings have a uniform purplish tinge. Pale postmedial strongly curved subcostally. The caterpillar is greenish. Head is glossy and whitish green. Pupa lacks a bloom. Larval host plant is Allophylus.

References

Moths of Asia
Moths described in 1893
Calpinae